Eileen Rossiter, (née Hughes) (July 14, 1929 – January 20, 2007) was a Canadian politician. She was the second Prince Edward Island woman appointed to Senate of Canada (the first was Florence Elsie Inman).

Born in Souris, Prince Edward Island, she was a realtor before being appointed to the Senate in 1986 representing the senatorial division of Prince Edward Island. She sat as a Progressive Conservative and later a Conservative. She retired on her 75th birthday in 2004.

She married Linus J. Rossiter in 1952. They had six children: Philip, Leonard, Kevin, Patricia, Colleen, and Mary.

External links
 

1929 births
2007 deaths
People from Souris, Prince Edward Island
Canadian senators from Prince Edward Island
Conservative Party of Canada senators
Progressive Conservative Party of Canada senators
Women members of the Senate of Canada
Women in Prince Edward Island politics
21st-century Canadian politicians
21st-century Canadian women politicians
20th-century Canadian women politicians